Ilaria del Carretto (1379 – 8 December 1405) was an Italian noblewoman and the second wife of Paolo Guinigi, the lord of Lucca from 1400 to 1430.

Biography
Ilaria del Carretto was born in Zuccarello, the daughter of Carlo, the Marchese del Carretto. In 1403 she married Paolo Guinigi and they had two children, Ladislao Guinigi, and a daughter, also named Ilaria. She died in Lucca at the age of twenty-six after giving birth to her daughter.

Tomb
Upon her death, Paolo commissioned the sculptor, Jacopo della Quercia, to create a marble sarcophagus now located in the Cathedral of San Martino in Lucca. In the finished work, she reclines peacefully with a dog, symbol of fidelity, at her feet.

The sarcophagus was not actually used and Ilaria del Carretto is buried in the Guinigi chapel of Santa Lucia in San Francesco.

In 1991, James Beck an American art historian and authority on the sculpture of Jacopo della Quercia severely criticized a 1990 restoration of the tomb which removed the patina. He was unsuccessfully sued for defamation by the conservator.

The sarcophagus features some of the earliest putti in sculpture since classical antiquity and predates those of Donatello.

References

Further reading
 Neria De Giovanni, Neria (2007). Ilaria Del Carretto. La donna del Giungi. Lucca: Pacini Fazzi. .
 Paoli, Marco (1999). The Monument of Ilaria del Carretto in the Cathedral of Lucca. Lucca: Pacini Fazzi.

External links
 

1379 births
1405 deaths
14th-century Italian women
15th-century Italian women
Guinigi family
People from Lucca
14th-century Italian nobility
15th-century Italian nobility